Highway 89 is a major east–west highway in the Upper Galilee and Western Galilee in northern Israel. It begins in the west in Nahariya and continues east to Ma'alot-Tarshiha, Safed, Hatzor HaGlilit and Rosh Pina, crossing the entire Galilee. It is 58 kilometers long

The route begins in the west at Nahariya junction with Highway 4 and continues east past a number of moshavim, kibbutzim and villages until it reaches Ma'alot-Tarshiha. Afterward the road continues to Meron mountain, where it turns south toward Safed and passes south of the city. It continues east toward its eastern terminus, a junction with Highway 90 at Elifelet

See also
List of highways in Israel

 Driving on the highway from west to east (video)

89